Stylonema is a genus of red algae, common in Australian waters. It is distinguishable from other species of red algae by the width of the filaments of its thallus, being only one cell across.

It includes the species Stylonema alsidii.

References

External links
 
 

Stylonematophyceae
Red algae genera